Reginald Sutherland "Rusty" Reid (February 17, 1899 in Seaforth, Ontario - January 14, 1986) was a Canadian ice hockey player who played 2 seasons in the National Hockey League for the Toronto St. Patricks between 1924 and 1926. He also played several years in senior and minor leagues during his career, which lasted from 1916 to 1931.

Career statistics

Regular season and playoffs

References

External links

1899 births
1986 deaths
Canadian ice hockey left wingers
Ice hockey people from Ontario
People from Huron County, Ontario
Stratford Nationals players
Toronto St. Pats players